Biba Apparels is an Indian fashion brand for women and girls founded by Meena Bindra in 1988 in New Delhi. It has more than 150 brand outlets and 225 multi-brand outlets. Biba recorded sales of INR 600 crore in 2014-15.

History

In 1982, Meena Bindra started a small-time clothes designing business from her home with a loan of 8000. The brand Biba was established in 1988 and initially operated as a wholesaler of Biba brand clothes to retail companies.

Biba opened its first standalone store in 2004, at Inorbit in Mumbai. Kishore Biyani’s Future Group acquired a 6.5% stake in Biba in 2007. Future group divested from Biba Apparels in 2013. In 2014, Biba Apparels acquired a minority stake in the designer label Anju Modi.

Bollywood fashion 

In 2002, BIBA tied up with Mukta Arts to replicate designer costumes from four of its movies Taal, Yaadein, Pardes and Badhai Ho Badhai, thus tapping the Merchandising movie memorabilia of the Indian market.

It made its first stint in Bollywood merchandising with its integration in Na tum Jaano Na Hum, followed by many others including blockbuster movies such as Devdas, Hulchal and Baghban.

Collaboration
In October 2012, BIBA joined hands with designer Manish Arora by taking up a 51% stake in the brand Indian by Manish Arora. This fashion apparel brand launched in 2009 and offers apparels such as salwar kameez, sarees, lehengas, kurtis, tunics, and T-shirts.

With its design collaboration with Rohit Bal, a niche collection, BIBA by Rohit Bal, was launched in 2013 to be retailed at select BIBA stores. The collection’s main focus was embroidery, gold and silver cutwork, and elegant Mughal block print patterns.

References

Indian fashion
Online retailers of India
Clothing brands
Indian clothing
Indian brands
Clothing retailers of India
1988 establishments in Delhi
Warburg Pincus companies